This is a list of notable Nigerian film screenwriters.

 Ossa Earliece
 Funsho Adeolu
 Kemi Adesoye
 Eric Aghimien
Jeffrey Musa
 Niji Akanni
 Abdulkareem Baba Aminu
 Chika Anadu
Gift Collins-Amadi
 Chet Anekwe
 Pascal Atuma
 Ishaya Bako
 Toluwani Obayan
 Ola Balogun
 Biyi Bandele
Nicole Asinugo
 Philip Begho
 Genevieve Nnaji
 JJ Bunny
 Jude Idada
 Lancelot Oduwa Imasuen
 Emem Isong
 Akin Lewis
 Nkiru Njoku
 Charles Novia
 Femi Odugbemi
 Kingsley Ogoro
 Stephanie Okereke Linus
 Kehinde Olorunyomi
 Tade Ogidan

Screenwriters